New Line Cinema is an American film production studio owned by Warner Bros. Discovery (WBD) and is a film label of Warner Bros.

It was founded in 1967 by Robert Shaye as an independent film distribution company; later becoming a film studio after acquired by Turner Broadcasting System in 1994; Turner later merged with Time Warner (later known as WarnerMedia from 2018 to 2022) in 1996, and New Line was merged with Warner Bros. Pictures in 2008. The studio has been nicknamed, "The House that Freddy Built" due to the success of the Nightmare on Elm Street film series.

History
New Line Cinema was established in 1967 by the then 27-year-old Robert Shaye as a film distribution company, supplying foreign and art films for college campuses in the United States. Shaye operated New Line's offices out of his apartment at 14th Street and Second Avenue in New York City. One of the company's early successes was its distribution of the 1936 anti-cannabis propaganda film Reefer Madness, which became a cult hit on American college campuses in the early 1970s. New Line also released many classic foreign-language films, like Stay As You Are, Immoral Tales and Get Out Your Handkerchiefs (which became the first New Line film to win an Oscar). The studio has also released many of the films of John Waters.

In 1976, New Line secured funding to produce its first full-length feature, Stunts (1977), directed by Mark L. Lester. Although not considered a critical success, the film performed well commercially on the international market and on television.

In 1980, Shaye's law school classmate Michael Lynne became outside counsel and adviser to the company and renegotiated its debt.

In 1983, Bryanston Distributing Company, the company that first distributed the original The Texas Chain Saw Massacre, lost the rights to that film, and the rights reverted to the original owners. New Line bought the rights and re-released the film to theatres that same year. It became very successful for the studio.

New Line expanded its film production in the early 1980s, producing or co-producing films including Polyester, directed by John Waters, and Alone in the Dark. Polyester was one of the first films to introduce a novelty cinema experience named Odorama, where members of the audience were provided with a set of "scratch and sniff" cards to be scratched and sniffed at specific times during the film, which provided an additional sensory connection to the viewed image. In 1983, Lynne joined the board. In 1984, Dawn Altyn and Jeff Youngs joined New Line, respectively as sales manager, eastern and southern divisions of New Line Distribution, and national print controller of the studio, to distribute new projects.

A Nightmare on Elm Street
A Nightmare on Elm Street was produced and released by New Line in 1984. The resulting franchise was New Line's first commercially successful series, leading the company to be nicknamed "The House that Freddy Built". The film was made on a budget of $1.8 million and grossed over $57 million. A year later, A Nightmare on Elm Street 2: Freddy's Revenge was released, and grossed $3.3 million in its first three days of release and over $30 million at the US box office. In 1986, the company went public, and held 1,613,000 shares of common stock. That year, New Line revamped their distribution network planned to release 12 films a year, aiming at five-to-seven in-house productions, and three to five acquisitions made for the studio.

On July 30, 1986, the studio had inked an agreement with Embassy Communications whereas Embassy would distribute five titles from the New Line catalog onto off-net syndication, which was destined for a spot on Embassy IV & V. The following year, on June 10, 1987, New Line Cinema had inked an agreement with Universal Pay Television, to receive 11 pictures under the agreement for pay television, and the pact provides significant minimum degrees in excess of $10 million, and line up licensing deals to the companies offered to Universal, such as HBO/Cinemax and Showtime/The Movie Channel. In the late 1980s, it set up a new international division, New Line International, to be headed by Andrew Milner, who will come in 1987 to the MIFED screens by its debut.

The third film in the series, A Nightmare on Elm Street 3: Dream Warriors, was released in 1987, the studio's first national release, and opened at number one, grossing $8.9 million for the weekend, a record for an independent film at the time, and went on to gross almost $45 million at the US box office. A further six films have been made. The first six grossed $500 million worldwide and the next three $250 million, for a total of $750 million.

Teenage Mutant Ninja Turtles
In 1990, Lynne became president and chief operating officer, with Shaye as chairman and chief executive officer. The same year, New Line released Teenage Mutant Ninja Turtles which became the highest-grossing independent film of all-time with a gross of $135 million in the United States and Canada, until it was surpassed by The Blair Witch Project (1999). It was followed by a sequel, Teenage Mutant Ninja Turtles II: The Secret of the Ooze (1991) which was the second highest-grossing with a gross of $78 million in the United States and Canada. A third, Teenage Mutant Ninja Turtles III followed in 1993.

Expansion
In November 1990, New Line purchased a 52% stake in the television production company RHI Entertainment (now Sonar Entertainment), which would later be sold to Hallmark Cards in 1994.

In early 1991, Fine Line Features was set up as a wholly owned subsidiary headed by Ira Deutchman and released films including Jane Campion's An Angel at My Table and Gus van Sant's My Own Private Idaho. Halfway through the year, Carolco Pictures, entered into a joint venture with New Line to start Seven Arts, a distribution company which primarily released much of Carolco's low-budget output. In 1997, Shine received the studio's first nomination for the Academy Award for Best Picture and their second film to win an Academy Award with Geoffrey Rush's win for Academy Award for Best Actor.

In May 1991, New Line purchased the home video and foreign rights to 600 films held by Sultan Entertainment Holdings (aka Nelson Entertainment Group). The deal also included an 11-film distribution deal with Turner subsidiary Castle Rock Entertainment. On November 27, 1991, New Line purchased Sultan outright.

In 1992, Michael De Luca became executive vice-president and chief executive officer of the production unit.

Acquisition by Turner and Time Warner
On January 28, 1994, New Line Cinema was acquired by the Turner Broadcasting System for $500 million, which later merged with Time Warner in 1996. New Line Cinema was kept as its own separate entity, while fellow Turner-owned studios Hanna-Barbera Productions and Castle Rock Entertainment eventually became units of Warner Bros.

During its time as an entity separate from Warner Bros., New Line Cinema continued to operate several divisions, including theatrical distribution, marketing and home video.

The company's fortunes took a downturn in 1996 after losses on The Island of Dr. Moreau and The Long Kiss Goodnight.

The Lord of the Rings
New Line produced The Lord of the Rings film trilogy which became their most successful films to date, grossing over $2.9 billion worldwide. The films were nominated for 30 Academy Awards, including nominations for the Academy Award for Best Picture for each film, and won 17, with the final picture, The Lord of the Rings: The Return of the King (2003) winning a (joint) record eleven, including Best Picture, as well as being the second highest-grossing film of all time at the time of its release.

Despite the success of The Lord of the Rings films, Town and Country (2001) generated a loss of $100 million and De Luca left as production head to be replaced by Toby Emmerich. In 2001, Shaye and Lynne became co-chairmen and co-CEO.

The studio was also a partner in founding a new distribution company named Picturehouse in 2005. Specializing in independent film, Picturehouse was formed by Bob Berney, who left distributor Newmarket Films, New Line, who folded their Fine Line division into Picturehouse, and HBO Films, a division of HBO and a subsidiary of Time Warner, who was interested in getting into the theatrical film business.

Merger with Warner Bros.
On February 28, 2008, Time Warner's CEO at the time, Jeffrey Bewkes, announced that New Line would be shut down as a separately operated studio. Shaye and Lynne said that they would step down with a letter to their employees. They promised, however, along with Time Warner and Jeffery Bewkes, that the company would continue to operate its financing, producing, marketing and distributing operations of its own films, but would do so as a part of Warner Bros. and be a smaller studio, releasing a smaller number of films than in past years. The box office disappointment of The Golden Compass (2007) was largely blamed for the decision, in which New Line spent $180 million on its development, yet it only grossed $70 million in the United States market. In March, Emmerich became president and chief operating officer, whilst both founders Robert Shaye and Michael Lynne had left the company.

On May 8, 2008, it was announced that Picturehouse would shut down in the fall. Berney later bought the Picturehouse trademarks from Warner Bros. and relaunched the company in 2013.

New Line moved from its long-time headquarters on Robertson Boulevard in Los Angeles in June 2014 to Warner Bros.' lot Building 76, formerly used by Legendary Entertainment, a former Warner Bros. film co-financier. The last film released by New Line Cinema as a free-standing company was the Will Ferrell film Semi-Pro.

As for the company's future, Alan Horn, the Warner Bros. president at the time of the consolidation, stated, "There's no budget number required. They'll be doing about six per year, though the number may go from four to seven; it's not going to be 10." As to content, "New Line will not just be doing genre [...] There's no mandate to make a particular kind of movie."

Films

Film series

Highest-grossing films

*Includes theatrical reissue(s).

See also
 Fine Line Features
 New Line Home Entertainment
 New Line Television
 Picturehouse (with HBO)

References

External links
 
 
 

 
1967 establishments in New York City
1994 mergers and acquisitions
1996 mergers and acquisitions
2008 mergers and acquisitions
American companies established in 1967
American independent film studios
Companies based in Burbank, California
Companies based in Los Angeles
Entertainment companies based in California
Film distributors of the United States
Film production companies of the United States
Mass media companies established in 1967
Warner Bros. divisions